is a Japanese footballer who plays as a striker.

He was educated at and played for Maebashiikuei High School.

In 2013, he joined Albirex Niigata FC (Singapore) as part of the football development program with JAPAN Soccer College.

His contract renewal for 2014 S.League season was announced on 3 December 2013.

Club career statistics
As of 3 February 2014

External links
 Yoshinaga Arima renews contract
 Player Profile on Albirex Niigata FC (S) Official Website.

1993 births
Living people
Japanese footballers
Singapore Premier League players
Japan Soccer College players
Albirex Niigata Singapore FC players
Association football forwards